Bouřka  is a 1968 Czechoslovak film. The film starred Josef Kemr.

References

1968 films
Czechoslovak comedy films
1960s Czech-language films
Czech comedy films
1960s Czech films
Czech television films